Karlstad is the 20th-largest city in Sweden, the seat of Karlstad Municipality, the capital of Värmland County, and the largest city in the province Värmland in Sweden. The city proper had 65,856 inhabitants in 2020 with 95,167 inhabitants in the wider municipality in 2021, and is the 21st biggest municipality in Sweden. Karlstad has a university and a cathedral.

During recent years, Karlstad has started seeing big growth with many new buildings, for example the new apartment complexes around Orrholmen/Tullholmen, hosting a brand new Coop store and a 17 story high rise apartment which was finished in late 2022. 

Karlstad is built on the river delta where Sweden's longest river, Klarälven, runs into Sweden's largest lake, Vänern. It has the second largest lake port in the country after Västerås.

Karlstad is often associated with sunshine and the symbol for Karlstad is a smiling sun. Karlstad is reputed to be one of the sunniest towns in Sweden and a local waitress, known as "Sola i Karlstad" (the Sun in Karlstad) for her sunny disposition, is also commemorated with a statue.

History
On Karlstad's largest islet, there was a place of counsel called Tingvalla in the medieval age, which had roots from the Viking Age before 1000 AD. It was also used as a market place.Karlstad was granted its city charter on March 5, 1584, by the Swedish Duke Charles, who would later be crowned King Charles IX of Sweden. The city derives its name from the King – Karlstad literally means Charles' city. The Duke also granted Karlstad the right as a governmental seat in the region, and gave it a substantial amount of land.

The Duke built his own house in the city, which is referred to as Kungsgården (The King's Manor). Karlstad's Cathedral was built on the location Kungsgården in 1724–1730 by Christian Haller.

Then most significant coup d'état in modern Swedish history had its beginning in Karlstad. During the night of 7 March 1809, major general Georg Adlersparre used the part of the western army that was stationed in Värmland to occupy Karlstad. From there officially proclaimed a revolution, and during 9 March, he and his soldiers began their march toward the capital to end the reign of king Gustav IV Adolf.

Karlstad has suffered four major fires.  Only the cathedral and a few houses remained after the last fire on July 2, 1865. Karlstad was thereafter rebuilt according to a grid pattern with wide streets surrounded by trees.

In 1905, the agreement to dissolve the union between Norway and Sweden was negotiated and signed in Karlstad.

Demographics

Language
The official language, Swedish, is the native language of a big majority and also spoken by most people in Karlstad. Immigration has also established five notable minority languages:
 Arabic
 Somali
 Sorani
 Persian
 Serbo-Croatian; Bosnian, Croatian and Serbian (in practice treated as one language).

Religion

Karlstad has several Christian denominations, including the Church of Sweden, with notable churches such as the Karlstad Cathedral built in 1730. In the 1800s, a small Jewish community formed in Karlstad and built a synagogue in 1899, which was later demolished in 1961.

Education
Several upper secondary schools (gymnasium) offer the most common range of courses usually available throughout Sweden, including the IB Diploma Programme. The majority of students in Värmland need to commute or move to Karlstad for their upper secondary education. Tertiary education is offered by Karlstad University, which was granted university status in 1999.

Culture

Media

Värmlands Folkblad and Nya Wermlands-Tidningen are both located in Karlstad, with county-wide circulations.

Sports and recreation

Winter sports

Ice hockey is a highly popular spectator sport in Karlstad. The most popular club is Färjestad BK. The team plays in the Swedish Hockey League (SHL, highest level) and their home arena is Löfbergs Arena. The club has won the Swedish Championship several times, most recently in 2022, and is the most successful ice hockey club in Sweden since the foundation of Elitserien (Swedish Hockey League since 2013) in 1975. Several other ice hockey clubs exist and Karlstad is also represented in the 1st Division of ice hockey (3rd highest level) by the team Skåre BK. The 2010 Men's World Inline Hockey Championships was also hosted by Karlstad, with Löfbergs Arena as the primary site of the tournament.

Traditionally, bandy has been the most popular winter sport in Karlstad, and the city is the home of two of the historically most successful clubs in Sweden, IF Boltic and IF Karlstad-Göta. Boltic reached 10 Swedish finals in a row from 1979 to 1988. They won the first 7 and the one in 1988. They also won in 1995. In 2000, the two clubs merged into BS BolticGöta, which is now the major bandy club in Karlstad. After a successful season in Allsvenskan 2009/2010 the team qualified for Elitserien, but was again relegated for the 2011/2012 season. The home arena, Tingvalla Ice Stadium, built in 1967, is claimed to be one of Europe's largest artificially frozen areas and is currently awaiting a decision by the municipality to eventually become renovated and transformed into an indoor ice rink. Afghans living in Karlstad has taken a liking to the sport and set up an Afghanistan national bandy team, which is based in the city.

Karlstad is a regular host of start, finish and special stages for the Swedish Rally. The competition has world championship status and is held annually in Värmland.

Summer sports

Several football clubs exist, and the highest-ranking team is QBIK. The club was founded in 1978, and entered the premier division of women's football, Damallsvenskan, in 2005. The team currently plays in the 1st Division (2nd highest level), but has several players in the Swedish national team.  Their home ground is Tingvalla IP, and the facility was also  the home ground for the football team Karlstad BK, that played in the men's Division 1 Norra (3rd highest level), having gained promotion following a successful 2010 season. The third highest-ranking football team was Carlstad United. The club was founded in 1998 by an alliance of seven local football clubs, with the aim of providing Karlstad with an elite football team. The club was accepted by the Swedish Football Association (SvFF) in 1999 and the team played in the men's Division 2 Norra Götaland (4th highest level). Carlstad United and Karlstad BK ended up merging into IF Karlstad Fotboll, who compete in Division 1 Norra. Another big one is FBK Karlstad, who currently play in Division 3 Västra Svealand.

American football is also played on Tingvalla IP. The Carlstad Crusaders play in Superserien, the highest level and since the founding of the club in 1990, the team has attended eight finals, winning its first championship in 2010.

Karlstad is also famous for athletics. The club IF Göta has a number of international athletes and host the annual athletics meet Götagalan. There is an outdoor athletics track at Tingvalla IP and an indoor track (200 m) in Våxnäshallen.

Another prominent sports club in Karlstad is OK Tyr, one of the largest orienteering clubs in Sweden. OK Tyr won Tiomila in 1989 and 1990.

Public facilities
Public sports facilities in Karlstad include Klarälvsbanan, a  cycle path on a former railway line running north from Karlstad to Hagfors. It is popular with cyclists, inlines skaters and roller skiers.

There is also a large number of open-air beaches and bathing spots by Vänern, smaller lakes and Klarälven in the municipality, and a  indoor municipal swimming pool.

Many wood-chip jogging trails, some of which are lit, can be found in the city outskirts. During wintertime, several are used for cross-country skiing.

Climate
Karlstad has a humid continental climate (Dfb) with influence from the surrounding waters of Vänern and the inflow from the Atlantic Ocean. It has large differences between seasons and is moderately influenced by both marine and land airflows. The highest recorded temperature since 1901 is 34.0°C (93.2°F) in July 1933 and the lowest is -36.0°C (-32.8°F) from February 1966.

Notable residents
Adam Alsing, radio and television host
 Gustaf Bengtsson, musician and composer
Jonas Brodin, National Hockey League ice hockey player
Niklas Edin, 2013 World Men's Curling Champion
Nils Ferlin, poet
Gustaf Fröding, poet
JH Engström, contemporary photographer
Stefan Holm, notable high jumper, 2004 Olympic gold medalist
Zarah Leander, notable UFA actress
Lina Länsberg, professional mixed martial artist and two times gold medalist in the IFMA World Championship in Muay Thai
Martin Molin, composer, inventor, and member of the band Wintergatan
Thomas Rhodin, ice hockey player (four times Swedish Champion with Färjestads BK)
Christer Sjögren, rock/dansband singer (Vikingarna)
Ulf Sterner, ice hockey player (first European schooled player to play in the National Hockey League)
Jenny Fransson, wrestler
Joel Eriksson Ek, Ice hockey player, Ice Hockey World Championship winner
Oscar Klefbom, plays for the Edmonton Oilers
Mikaela Åhlin-Kottulinsky, racing driver

Image gallery

See also
Karlstad Airport
Karlstad University
Swedish American Center

References

External links

 
County seats in Sweden
Populated lakeshore places in Sweden
Populated places in Värmland County
Populated places in Karlstad Municipality
Municipal seats of Värmland County
Swedish municipal seats
Cities in Värmland County